Elizabeth City State University (ECSU) is a public historically black university in Elizabeth City, North Carolina. It enrolls nearly 2,500 students in 28 undergraduate programs and 4 graduate programs and is a member-school of the Thurgood Marshall College Fund and the University of North Carolina system.

History

Elizabeth City State University was established by the North Carolina General Assembly on March 3, 1891, as the State Colored Normal School at Elizabeth City'', in response to a bill calling for the creation of a two-year Normal School for the "teaching and training [of] teachers of the colored race to teach in the common schools of North Carolina." Peter Weddick Moore was its first leader. The school provided training for teachers of primary grades.

The campus quadrangle and six surrounding buildings are included in the Elizabeth City State Teachers College Historic District, listed on the National Register of Historic Places in 1994.

In 1937, the school made the transformation into a full four-year teachers college and was officially named Elizabeth City State Teachers College, while expanding its role to include the training of principals as well. In 1939, the college awarded its first bachelor of science degrees in its program of elementary education. Within the following twenty-five years, the college expanded its offerings to include a vocational-technical program and a total of thirteen academic majors.

In December 1961, the college gained membership in the Southern Association of Colleges and Schools.  In 1963 its name was changed to Elizabeth City State College. In 1969, its name was changed to Elizabeth City State University to reflect expansion and the addition of graduate programs.  When the University of North Carolina System was formed in 1972, ECSU became one of the system's sixteen constituent universities and entered into its current phase of development and organization. ECSU is home to the only four-year aviation science degree program in North Carolina.

In 2020, Elizabeth City State received $15 million from MacKenzie Scott.  Her donation is the largest single gift in the university's history.

List of Chief Executive OfficersSource:'''

 Peter Weddick Moore, A.M., LL.D. (Principal, 1891–1928, President Emeritus, 1928–1934)
 John Henry Bias, A.B., LL.D. (President, 1928–1939)
 Harold Leonard Trigg, Ed.D. (President, 1939–1945)
 Sidney David Williams, A.M., D.PED. (President, 1946–1958, President Emeritus, 1969–1974)
 Walter Nathaniel Ridley, Ed.D. (President, 1958–1968, President Emeritus, 1988–1996)
 Marion Dennis Thorpe, Ph.D. (President, 1968–1972, Chancellor, 1972–1983)
 Jimmy Raymond Jenkins, Ph.D. (Chancellor, 1983–1995, Chancellor Emeritus, 1995–present)
 Mickey Lynn Burnim, Ph.D. (Chancellor, 1995–2006)
 Willie J. Gilchrist, Ed.D. (Chancellor, 2006–2013)
 Charles L. Becton, J.D. (Interim Chancellor, 2013–2014)
 Stacey Franklin Jones, Ph.D. (Chancellor, 2014-2015)
 Thomas Conway, Ph.D. (Interim Chancellor, January 1, 2016 – 2018)
 Karrie Gibson Dixon, Ed.D. (Chancellor, 2018–present)

Campus
ECSU's campus encompasses , mostly flanked by residential districts.

Academics
ECSU offers 28 baccalaureate degrees and four master's degrees in one of the following academic departments:

 Aviation and Emergency Management
 Business, Accounting and Sport Management
 Education
 English and Digital Media
 Health and Human Studies
 Mathematics, Computer Science and Engineering Technology
 Military Science
 Music and Visual Arts
 Natural Sciences
 Social Sciences

ECSU also offers special programs that appeal to various interests and fields of study, including the honors program (for high-achieving undergraduates), military science, and study abroad.

Student life
Students can choose to be involved in various on-campus organizations, including fraternities, sororities, radio station WRVS-FM, campus TV station, and intramural sports.
Students are able to join the Student Government Association to help make campus life more interesting for student continuing to enroll here. Also, students can choose to apply to Vikings Assisting New Students to lead the New Student Orientation and answer any questions that parents or student may have about the school and campus life

Athletics

As a member of the National Collegiate Athletic Association, ECSU's athletes, known athletically as the Vikings, compete in the Division II athletic conference known as the Central Intercollegiate Athletic Association (CIAA).

Notable alumni

Notes

External links

 
 ECSU Athletics website

 
1891 establishments in North Carolina
Buildings and structures in Pasquotank County, North Carolina
Education in Pasquotank County, North Carolina
Educational institutions established in 1891
Historically black universities and colleges in the United States
Liberal arts colleges in North Carolina
Public universities and colleges in North Carolina
Universities and colleges accredited by the Southern Association of Colleges and Schools